Cuanza Sul Province ("South Cuanza"; Umbundu: Kwanza Kombuelo Volupale) is a province of Angola. Sumbe is the capital of the province. Dom  founded the province in 1769 as Novo Redondo.

History
The province was badly affected during the Angolan Civil War (1975–2002). A large number of civilians were killed in the clashes between National Union for the Total Independence of Angola (UNITA) and Angolan Armed Forces (FAA). Coffee plantations and fields were destroyed. Frequent attacks forced people to leave their municipalities. UNITA had opened its central front in the province. Around 116,000 displaced people were living in camps. The majority of them were from the rural areas and the densely populated plateau regions. On 17 December 2000, the UNITA combatants killed 31 FAA soldiers and looted vehicles, arms and about 20,000 litres of diesel in Quibala. In April 2001 they attacked FAA outposts and captured firearms.

Landmines laid during the civil war are still present and contracts to clear them were given to different organisations. They are still present in several areas. The province has a high density of landmines. In 2008 the province's Maria Restino Manuel was declared the Internet winner of Miss Landmine 2008. She had secured 29% of the online votes.

Geography

Kibalas, N'goias, Musseles, Mussumbas and Bailundos are the major ethnic groups in the province. The Kimbundu language is most commonly used. Umbundu is also spoken. Bengo Province and Cuanza Norte Province are located to its north. Malanje and Bie Provinces are located to its east, while Huambo and Benguela provinces border it in south. Cuanza Sul city lies on the southern bank of the Cuanza River.

Municipalities
Within Cuanza Sul Province includes the following municipalities:

 Amboim (Gabela)
 Cassongue
 Conda
 Ebo
 Libolo (Calulo)
 Mussende
 Porto Amboim
 Quibala
 Quilenda
 Seles (Uku Seles)
 Sumbe (Ngangula)
 Waku-Kungo (Cela)

Communes
The province of Cuanza Sul contains the following communes; sorted by their respective municipalities:

 Amboim Municipality: – Assango, Gabela
 Cassongue Municipality: – Atôme, Cassongue, Dumbi, Pambangala (Pampangala)
 Conda Municipality: – Conda, Cunjo
 Ebo Municipality: – Condé, Ebo, Kassange (Quissanje)
 Libolo Municipality: – Cabuta (Kabuta), Calulo, Munenga, Quissongo (Kissongo)
 Mussende Municipality: – Mussende, Quienha (Kienha), São Lucas
 Porto Amboim Municipality: – Capolo (Kapolo), Porto Amboim
 Quibala Municipality: – Cariango (Kariango), Dala Cachibo, Lonhe, Quibala (Kibala)
 Quilenda Municipality: – Quilenda (Kilenda), Quirimbo (Kirimbo)
 Seles Municipality: –  Amboiva, Botera, Seles
 Sumbe Municipality: – Gangula (Ngangula), Gungo, Quicombo (Kicombo), Sumbe
 Waku-Kungo (Cela) Municipality: – Kissanga Kungo (Quissanga Cunjo), Sanga, Uaco Cungo

Administration
The province's governor is Eusébio de Brito Teixeira. António da Gama Lopes Teixeira, Mateus Alves Morais de Brito and Maria de Lourdes Sousa Abambres Veiga are deputy governors for Technical and infrastructure Services, Economic Sector Area and Political and Social Sector Area respectively.

Economy and education
Coffee, cotton, fruits, rice and tobacco are the major agricultural products. The province has large deposits of alluvial and eluvial diamonds and Gypsum. Sumbe and Porto Amboim are major fish processing centres.

The Independent University of Angola is located in the province's capital and has emerged as the most important educational centre in the province. Established in August 2003 it offers courses in agronomy, veterinary science and forestry.

List of governors of Cuanza Sul

See also
Coçoço
Fort of Kikombo

References

Citations

Bibliography

External links 
 Information on this province at Info Angola
 Province geographical info at geoview.info

 
Provinces of Angola